is a series of role-playing video games created and developed by Compile Heart and Idea Factory. The series debuted in Japan on August 19, 2010, with the video game of the same name for the PlayStation 3, later re-released as an enhanced remake under the name Hyperdimension Neptunia Re;Birth 1 for the PlayStation Vita. Two sequels, Hyperdimension Neptunia mk2 and Hyperdimension Neptunia Victory, in addition to the remake titles for both of them and five spin-offs on the PlayStation Vita, have been released. Another sequel on the PlayStation 4, titled Megadimension Neptunia VII, was released in 2015. In addition, a remake of that game was released in 2017. Multiple spin-offs on the PlayStation 4 and PlayStation 5 have been released. It has branched off into a manga, light novel and anime media franchise series.

An anime television series adaptation, titled Hyperdimension Neptunia: The Animation, aired in Japan between July and September 2013. An OVA, titled Nepu no Natsuyasumi, was released in July 2019. A second OVA, titled Nep Nep Darake no Festival, was released in October 2022, and third OVA, titled Hidamari no Little Purple, will be released in April 2023.

Setting

Each region is completely different from the others in appearance and atmosphere, with each representing a specific video game console. Lastation represents the PlayStation, Lowee represents the Wii, and Leanbox represents the Xbox, while Planeptune represents the cancelled Sega Neptune. In the beginning of the story, the four goddesses are fighting each other for "shares" in a war known as the Console War. Shares are the manifestation of the belief citizens put into their goddess, and without shares, a goddess dies. Because some of the games feature time and/or dimension travel there are slight differences in the settings for each title.

Development
Prior to Q3 2009, Compile Heart was conceptualising a new RPG project centred upon character designs by Tsunako, with the intention of collaborating with a partner company. This game was originally planned to feature three princess sisters and a protagonist. However, the partnership deal fell out, and as a result the project plans were redesigned and eventually became "Neptunia" close to the end of 2009 following the completion of Trinity Universes development. During the early stages of the project, the characters Noire and Blanc were originally coloured red and blue respectively, however their colour schemes were changed to black and white so that they could better fit in with the new game setting and plot.

The release of the first sequel to the original game, Hyperdimension Neptunia mk2, saw the introduction of a reworked game engine and the replacement of various components such as the battle system and dungeons, which were completely rebuilt from scratch. Hyperdimension Neptunia Victory later built on this, with the parts from mk2 which were considered "weak" by the developers removed and improved, eventually setting Victory as the foundation for the design of future titles within the series. Following Compile Heart's collaboration with David Production to produce the Neptunia television animation series, the developers were able to change their approach to direction and script-writing based on their experience with the anime development staff, which resulted in the changes to the narrative found in the Re;Birth games on PlayStation Vita.

Release history
Hyperdimension Neptunia is the first game within the series, with the name originally derived from the scrapped Sega Neptune which combined the Sega Mega Drive/Genesis and Sega 32X into one unit, originally scheduled for release in 1994 or 1995 before the project was dropped after the release of the Sega Saturn.

There are two sequels which have been released under the names Hyperdimension Neptunia Mk2 and Hyperdimension Neptunia Victory. Another game, titled , was released on June 20, 2013, for the PlayStation Vita in Japan and it was released in the west in June 2014 as Hyperdimension Neptunia: Producing Perfection, developed by Compile Heart, Idea Factory and Tamsoft.

During a streamed interview at Tokyo Game Show 2013, Idea Factory and Compile Heart announced that Hyperdimension Neptunia Re;Birth 2: Sisters Generation was under development,. Re;Birth 2 was released on March 20, 2014.  with Noire as the main character, was released on May 29, 2014.

Hyperdimension Neptunia U: Action Unleashed is an action game spin-off exclusively for the PlayStation Vita released on August 28, 2014, in Japan, developed by Tamsoft, whilst Megadimension Neptunia VII is a main series title for the PlayStation 4.

At Tokyo Game Show 2014, an enhanced remake of Hyperdimension Neptunia Victory for the PlayStation Vita, titled Hyperdimension Neptunia Re;Birth 3: V Century, was announced.

Games

Main series

Hyperdimension Neptunia (2010)

Remade as Hyperdimension Neptunia Re;Birth 1 released in 2013, Hyperdimension Neptunia Re;Birth 1 Plus in 2018, and Neptunia re★Verse in 2020.

Hyperdimension Neptunia mk2 (2011)

The second game the series. It introduced gameplay mechanics and new set of characters, as well as interpretations of the previous onces, that became a mainstay in the series. The game's plot tackles more about the major consequences on video game piracy, albeit presented in a black-and-white manner. It was later remade as Hyperdimension Neptunia Re;Birth 2: Sisters Generation which was initially released in 2014 for PlayStation Vita and Steam.

Hyperdimension Neptunia Victory (2012)

The third game in the series, which mainly takes in an alternate dimension and is based around gaming culture around the early generations until the sixth-generation era of gaming. It received an enhanced version for the PlayStation Vita and Steam as Hyperdimension Neptunia Re;Birth 3: V Generation which was initially released in 2014.

Megadimension Neptunia VII (2015)

The first game in the series for PlayStation 4 released worldwide in 2016. The game's plot is slightly inspired by the shift from the seventh generation of consoles to the 8th generation, as well as the history of the Sega Dreamcast. The game received a remake, framed as a retelling of the True Ending route, in 2017 as Megadimension Neptunia VIIR which featured new cutscenes with VR support. Released on the same platforms as the original (except for the Nintendo Switch).

Spin-offs

Hyperdimension Neptunia: Producing Perfection (2013)

An idol-raising simulator game with rhythm and dating sim elements. It is the first game in the series to be on the PlayStation Vita and was the only game in the series to not receive a port to PCs.

Neptunia Collection (2013)
An online mobile card game for Android and iOS developed by Idea Factory and hosted by GREE starting from February 15, 2013. It is a collectible card game which involves social networking elements. The game's servers shut down on July 31, 2014.

Hyperdevotion Noire: Goddess Black Heart (2014)

Turn-based tactical role-playing game which utilizes a battle grid.

Hyperdimension Neptunia U: Action Unleashed (2014)

Musou-type real-time action game.

MegaTagmension Blanc + Neptune VS Zombies (2015)
Multiplayer action game.

Superdimension Neptune vs Sega Hard Girls (2015)
Crossover RPG with the Sega Hard Girls franchise.

Cyberdimension Neptunia: 4 Goddesses Online (2017)

Action RPG.

Neptunia & Friends (2017)
Interaction/Card game released in Japan for Android and iOS. The localized version was released exclusively for iOS and featured less characters and updates compared to the Japanese version.

Nep-Nep★Connect: Chaos Champloo (2017)
Free-to-play card battle game, and the first Neptunia game to not be released outside Japan. The game's support was terminated on August 8, 2018. Though it wasn't released outside Japan, the English version of Neptunia Virtual Stars gives this game the name "Nep-Nep★Connect: Chaos Champloo" when referring to characters that debuted in this game in game's collectible card list.

Super Neptunia RPG (2018)

2D side-scrolling action game. First title in the series to be developed outside Japan, and the first Neptunia title that was released on a Nintendo platform.

Neptunia Shooter (2019)
2D anime bullet hell game. First game to be exclusive to PC. Also the first game to be released on the same day worldwide. First game to be developed by Idea Factory International. First game to be published by Idea Factory in Japan instead of Compile Heart. It was ported to PlayStation 5 alongside Neptunia re★Verse.

Neptunia Virtual Stars (2020)
A hack 'n' slash game with rhythm elements that tackles and parodies culture around social media, featuring various Vtubers. The first game in the series not to receive an English dub due to the amount of guest Vtubers present.

Neptunia x Senran Kagura: Ninja Wars (2021)
Crossover with the Senran Kagura series. The second game in the series not to receive an English dub due to a request from Xseed Games.

Dimension Tripper Neptune: Top Nep (2022)
Rail shooter game exclusive to PC developed by Frontier Works.

Neptunia: Sisters vs. Sisters (2022)
Action RPG starring the candidates. For the first time, the character models have been remade from scratch. It was released in Japan on April 21, 2022, for PlayStation 4 and PlayStation 5.
A Western version is set for a January 2023 release, including Steam.
This will be first game to have English dub since Super Neptunia RPG.

Other media

Manga
A manga series based on the game titled  began serialisation in November 2010 within the Famitsu Comic Clear.

A manga series illustrated by Mikage Baku which complements the television animation, titled , began serialisation within the June 2013 issue of Dengeki Maoh. A spin-off novel of the anime, titled Hyperdimension Neptunia TGS Hono no Futsukakan, was published by MF Bunko J and released May 25, 2013.

Anime

An anime adaptation, Hyperdimension Neptunia: The Animation was produced by David Production of Japan and directed by Masahiro Mukai. Series composition and script writing are done by Shōgo Yasukawa and a musical score composed by Hiroaki Tsutsumi, Kenji Kaneko and Masaru Yokoyama. Character designs are done by Hitomi Takechi, based on the original designs by Tsunako along with art direction by Masanobu Nomura and sound direction by Jin Aketagawa. The twelve-episode series aired on Tokyo MX on July 12, 2013, and were later aired on BS11, KBS, Sun TV and tvk then finished on September 27, 2013. The series was acquired by Funimation for online streaming in North America with both the English dub and the original Japanese dub with English subtitles. It was broadcast within the United States on Funimation Channel.

A new original video animation (OVA) titled Nepu no Natsuyasumi was announced to be in production. Returning staff members include Masahiro Mukai as director,  Hitomi Takechi as character designer, and Shōgo Yasukawa as scriptwriter, with animation by studio Okuruto Noboru. It premiered on July 8, 2019. A second OVA titled Nep Nep Darake no Festival was bundled with "Dimensional Traveler Neptune Generator Unit ver." 1/7 scale figure, which was released on December 15, 2021. A third OVA titled Hidamari no Little Purple was bundled with the "Neptune Little Purple ver." 1/7-scale figure, which was released on July 3, 2022.

The anime television series adaptation received a mixed response, with praise for its original story and humor revolving around video game industry in-jokes, and criticism for its use of melodrama.

Music
Most of the original soundtracks created for the Neptunia series were composed by Kenji Kaneko, with additional composers for Megadimension Neptunia VII and later games. The first, titled Hyperdimension Neptunia Sound Track CD, was released on August 19, 2010, and was bundled with a Japanese Limited Edition of the game. The soundtrack for the second game contained 13 tracks and was released in Japan with the limited edition on August 18, 2011. It was later repackaged with the western limited release on February 28, 2012, which featured 18 tracks and was titled Hyperdimension Neptunia mk2: Sounds of Gamindustri. The soundtrack for Hyperdimension Neptunia Victory was released on August 30, 2012, with the Japanese Limited Edition and contained 16 tracks. Similar to the second game, the soundtrack was released overseas with the Limited Edition of the game with 24 tracks, titled Hyperdimension Neptunia Victory Sounds of that other Gamindustri. The Megadimension VII soundtrack, MEGADIMENSION NEPTUNIA VII Dream Edition DG-ROM, was included with the Japanese Dream Edition and released in a 50 track, 3 disc format on April 23, 2015. Its overseas release, MEGADIMENSION NEPTUNIA Official Soundtrack was included exclusively with the Limited Edition online, containing only 45 tracks over 2 discs. Most recently, the soundtrack for 4 Goddesses Online was released on February 9, 2017, with the Royal Edition of the game.

For each title in the Re;Birth series, the soundtracks were re-released following each game's initial release, usually with a few additional or missing tracks. Re;Birth 2's soundtrack, titled Hyperdimension Neptunia Re;Birth2: SISTERS GENERATION ~ "Sisters' Melodies" Soundtrack CD was released exclusively on Idea Factory International's website with the Limited Edition of the game and contained 19 tracks from the game. Compile Heart and Idea Factory International later made the Re;Birth series available for the PC on the Steam platform, in which DLC included digital releases of the soundtrack for each game.

In addition to the game soundtracks, there have been CD single releases for the opening and ending themes for each game. The voice actresses for each character have also released individual singles, in which they perform original in-character songs. Various Drama CD series have also been released in which voice actors perform original episodes. The anime series also released singles for the opening and ending themes, alongside a drama CD and 7 special "Animation Processor" discs, which contained a variety of different audio media including songs, voice actor commentary, and drama episodes.

A compilation of the main vocal tracks from each game (including character songs) was released as a 5 disc series on August 27, 2014.

Mobile applications
Alarm clock applications and mobile skins/themes featuring Neptunia characters have also been released for Android and iOS.

Reception

References

External links

 
Anime television series based on video games
David Production
Funimation
Idea Factory franchises
Kadokawa Dwango franchises
Magical girl anime and manga
Manga based on video games
Mass media franchises
Multiplayer video games
Okuruto Noboru
Raising sims
Fiction about robots
Science fiction video games
Science fantasy video games
Seinen manga
Shōnen manga
Single-player video games
Superhero video games
Video game franchises
Video game franchises introduced in 2010